Ride, Kelly, Ride is a 1941 American drama film directed by Norman Foster and written by William Conselman Jr. and Irving Cummings Jr.. The film stars Eugene Pallette, Marvin Stephens, Rita Quigley, Mary Healy, Richard Lane and Charles D. Brown. The film was released on February 7, 1941, by 20th Century Fox.

Plot

An owner of racehorses, Dan Thomas, and his trainer Duke Martin discover a young fellow called "Corn Cob" Kelly on their way west. He has a natural way with horses, so they quickly teach him to become a jockey.

As his career begins, Corn Cob befriends a fellow rider, Skeeziks O'Day, and antagonizes another, Tuffy Graves, whose rough tactics cause Corn Cob to fall from a mount and suffer a broken shoulder. While recuperating, he gets word that Dan has conspired with gangsters to fix a race. Knowing that honest trainer Bob Martin and daughter Ellen have all their money riding on the race, Corn Cob decides to ride their horse, injured shoulder notwithstanding. He wins the race, putting Dan in hot water with the crooks.

Cast   
Eugene Pallette as Duke Martin
Marvin Stephens as Corn Cob Kelly
Rita Quigley as Ellen Martin
Mary Healy as Entertainer
Richard Lane as Dan Thomas
Charles D. Brown as Bob Martin
Chick Chandler as Knuckles
Dorothy Peterson as Mrs. Martin
Lee Murray as Tuffy Graves
Frankie Burke as Skeeziks O'Day
Cy Kendall as Louis Becker
Hamilton MacFadden as Race Track Steward
Spec O'Donnell as Kalinski
Ernie Adams as Sandy
Edwin Stanley as Steward
Edward Earle as Judge Pine

References

External links 
 

1941 films
20th Century Fox films
American drama films
1941 drama films
Films directed by Norman Foster
American black-and-white films
1940s English-language films
1940s American films